"La Pollera Colorá" is a Colombian cumbia song. It was composed in 1960 as an instrumental by clarinetist Juan Madera Castro. Singer-songwriter Wilson Choperena composed the lyrics in 1962.

Rankings
It has been rated as one of the best Colombian songs of all time by multiple media sources:

 In its list of the ten most iconic Colombian songs, El Nuevo Siglo, rated La Pollera Colorá at No. 1.

 In its list of the 50 best Colombian songs of all time, El Tiempo, Colombia's most widely circulated newspaper, ranked the version of the song recorded by Wilson Choperena with the Pedro Salceo orchestra at No. 5. 

 In its list of the top ten Colombian songs, El Heraldo rated Colombia Tierra Querida at No. 7.

 Viva Music Colombia rated the song No. 10 on its list of the 100 most important Colombian songs of all time.

Ownership dispute
Ownership of the rights to the song was later subject of legal proceedings. Juan Madera Castro accused Choperena of appropriating the song's rights and was in 2010 sentenced to 24 months in prison and ordered to pay a fine of more than 10 million Colombian pesos.

Versions
It is one of the most popular Colombian songs. It has been recorded by many artists including the following:

 Alberto Barros
 Carolina la O
 Wilson Choperena
 Juan Diego Flórez
 La Sonora Dinamita
 La Sonora Ponceña
 Los Corraleros de Majagual
 Los Llopis
 Los Wawancó
 Margarita la Diosa de la Cumbia
 Gonzalo Martinez
 Aniceto Molina
 Carmen Rivero
 Pedro Salcedo & His Orchestra
 Charlie Zaa

References

External links
 La pollera colorá at Spanish Wikipedia

Colombian songs
Cumbia songs